Okunevo is the name of several rural localities in Russia:
Okunevo, Republic of Buryatia, a settlement in Tsipikansky Selsoviet of Bauntovsky District of the Republic of Buryatia
Okunevo, Chelyabinsk Oblast, a village in Kocherdyksky Selsoviet of Oktyabrsky District of Chelyabinsk Oblast
Okunevo, Kaliningrad Oblast, a settlement in Kamensky Rural Okrug of Chernyakhovsky District of Kaliningrad Oblast
Okunevo, Kemerovo Oblast, a selo in Okunevskaya Rural Territory of Promyshlennovsky District of Kemerovo Oblast
Okunevo, Kirov Oblast, a settlement in Mikheyevsky Rural Okrug of Lebyazhsky District of Kirov Oblast
Okunevo, Nizhny Novgorod Oblast, a village in Vyazovsky Selsoviet of Tonkinsky District of Nizhny Novgorod Oblast
Okunevo, Omsk Oblast, a village in Bergamaksky Rural Okrug of Muromtsevsky District of Omsk Oblast
Okunevo, Pskov Oblast, a village in Pushkinogorsky District of Pskov Oblast
Okunevo, Sverdlovsk Oblast, a settlement in Turinsky District of Sverdlovsk Oblast
Okunevo, Tyumen Oblast, a selo in Okunevsky Rural Okrug of Berdyuzhsky District of Tyumen Oblast
Okunevo, Kirillovsky District, Vologda Oblast, a village in Talitsky Selsoviet of Kirillovsky District of Vologda Oblast
Okunevo, Vologodsky District, Vologda Oblast, a village in Semenkovsky Selsoviet of Vologodsky District of Vologda Oblast
Okunevo, Danilovsky District, Yaroslavl Oblast, a village in Seredskoy Rural Okrug of Danilovsky District of Yaroslavl Oblast
Okunevo, Nekrasovsky District, Yaroslavl Oblast, a village in Rodyukinsky Rural Okrug of Nekrasovsky District of Yaroslavl Oblast

See also
Okunev culture